The 2012 European Karate Championships, the 47th edition, were held in Adeje, Tenerife, Spain from 10 to 13 May 2012. A total of 450 competitors from 45 countries participated at the event.

Medalists

Men's competition

Individual

Team

Women's competition

Individual

Team

Medal table

References

2012
International karate competitions hosted by Spain
European Karate Championships
European championships in 2012
Sport in Tenerife
Karate competitions in Spain
May 2012 sports events in Europe